_
Makin may refer to:

Places
Makin (atoll), an atoll in Kiribati, known to U.S. military forces during World War II as "Little Makin"
Butaritari, an atoll in Kiribati known to U.S. military forces during World War II as "Makin Atoll" and "Makin Island"
Makin, Indiana, a small town in Warren Township, Huntington County, Indiana, United States
Makin, Pakistan, a town in South Waziristan, Federally Administered Tribal Areas, Pakistan
Makin, South Australia, a locality in South Australia
Division of Makin, an electoral division in South Australia, Australia
Hundred of Makin, a cadastral unit in South Australia
Makin Tehsil, South Waziristan Agency, Federally Administered Tribal Areas, Pakistan

Battles
The Makin Island raid, a 1942 raid by U.S. Marines on Japanese military forces on Butaritari during World War II
The Battle of Makin, the 1943 U.S. invasion of Butaritari during World War II

People
Bathsua Makin, English proto-feminist
Chris Makin, British footballer
Guy Makin (1879), South Australian architect, inaugural chairman of the Architects Board of South Australia
Joel Makin (born 1994), Welsh squash player
John and Sarah Makin, Australian baby farmers
Kelly Makin, Canadian director
Norman Makin, Australian politician
Rex Makin (1925–2017), English solicitor and philanthropist

Ships
 , more than one United States Navy ship

See also 
Makin v. Attorney General for New South Wales (1894), a Privy Council decision on similar fact evidence